Leopold II commonly refers to:

 Leopold II of Belgium (1835–1909)
 Leopold II, Holy Roman Emperor (1747–1792)

It may also refer to:

 Leopold II, Margrave of Austria (1050–1095)
 Leopold II, Duke of Austria (1328–1344)
 Leopold II, Prince of Anhalt-Dessau (1700–1751)
 Leopold II, Prince of Lippe (1796–1851)
 Leopold II, Grand Duke of Tuscany (1797–1870)